Tew or TEW may refer to:

People
Alan Tew, songwriter
Alex Tew, British Internet self-promoter
George Washington Tew (1829-1884), American Union army officer and brevet brigadier general 
Gloria Tew (1923-2022), American abstract artist
Henry Tew (1654–1718), colonial Deputy Governor of Rhode Island
Mary Tew, British anthropologist Mary Douglas
Philip Tew (born 1954), Professor of English (Post-1900 Literature), Brunel University
Thomas Tew, early American pirate, possible brother of Henry Tew
Allene Tew, an American socialite

Places
Great Tew, Oxfordshire
Little Tew, Oxfordshire:
Duns Tew, Oxfordshire

Video games
 Total Extreme Warfare, a professional wrestling text simulator
 The Enemy Within Campaign of Warhammer Fantasy Roleplay

Other
 Mason Jewett Field, a general aviation airport in Mason, Michigan, with the IATA code TEW
 Terrorism Early Warning Groups
 Thermoplastic Equipment Wire AKA MTW Machine Tool Wire

See also
Tewes, a surname
Týr, god of single combat, victory and heroic glory in Norse mythology